Geri Palast is the Managing Director of the Israel Action Network (IAN).  IAN is the joint initiative of The Jewish Federations of North America and the Jewish Council for Public Affairs to defend Israel's legitimacy, change the conversation about Israel and work towards the two state solution.

She is the sister of investigative journalist Greg Palast.

Early life, education, and family
Palast is a graduate of Stanford University with honors, and graduated as a Root Tilden Public Service Law scholar from NYU Law School.

Career
Palast has also served as the national Legislative and Political Director of Service Employees International Union (SEIU) and established and ran the Washington office of the National Employment Law Project (NELP). She has consulted with and served on numerous boards of NGOs, currently OpenSecrets and CFE. From 1993-2000, she served as the Assistant Secretary of Labor for Congressional and Intergovernmental Affairs under President Bill Clinton.

In 2000, she became the founder and executive director of two nonprofit organizations, Justice at Stake, a national judicial reform advocacy organization, and the Campaign for Fiscal Equity (CFE).

Israel Action Network
Geri Palast currently works as the Managing Director for the Israel Action Network.  The IAN was created by the Jewish Federations of North America, an American Jewish umbrella organization, to "mobilize communities to counter the Assault on Israel’s Legitimacy". It is a strategic initiative that defends Israel's right to exist as a democratic Jewish state within the North American Jewish community.  It advocates, "security for two states for two peoples."

See also
 Campaign for Fiscal Equity
 Justice at Stake Campaign
 Jewish Federations of North America

References

Living people
American lawyers
Greg Palast
Stanford University alumni
New York University School of Law alumni
Place of birth missing (living people)
Year of birth missing (living people)
Clinton administration personnel
American women lawyers
21st-century American women